"Itzy Bitzy Spider'" (also known as "Itsy Bitsy Spider") is the debut single by the Danish-Norwegian dance-pop group Aqua, under their original name of Joyspeed. The song is based on a nursery rhyme for young children called "Itsy Bitsy Spider", which has been remixed by Aqua into a techno-fused song.

Released in 1995, the single was a minor hit in Sweden, charting for one week. The song was also released in Denmark and Germany, although it failed to chart. It was the only Aqua release under their original manager, Michael Brinkenstjärna, who would later successfully sue them for royalties relating to this and later releases.

The single is now a rare collector's item with less than one thousand copies in existence. The song has not appeared on any of their studio or compilation albums.

Track listing
 "Itzy Bitzy Spider" (Original Reggae Version) – 3:26
 "Itzy Bitzy Spider" (Hard Radio Spider) – 3:47
 "Itzy Bitzy Spider" (Extended Joy Mix) – 4:31
 "Itzy Bitzy Spider" (K. Boff World Mix) – 4:43
 "Itzy Bitzy Spider" (Bonus Spider) – 0:38

References

1995 debut singles
1995 songs
Aqua (band) songs
Songs written by Søren Rasted
Songs written by Claus Norreen
Songs written by René Dif
Songs written by Lene Nystrøm
Songs based on children's songs